Atsion is an unincorporated community located within Shamong Township in Burlington County, New Jersey, United States. The community is located next to Atsion Lake.

The settlement is located within the Wharton State Forest, and a forest office, parking area and information kiosk are located at Atsion.

History
Charles Read built a bog iron forge in 1766. Samuel Richards, son of the owner of the iron works at Batsto Village, bought the property in 1822.

Historic district

Atsion Village is a historic district encompassing the community. It was added to the National Register of Historic Places on October 22, 1974 for its significance in architecture and industry. The district includes 7 contributing buildings. The Samuel Richards Mansion was built in 1826 with Greek Revival style.

References

External links
 
 
 

Shamong Township, New Jersey
Unincorporated communities in Burlington County, New Jersey
Unincorporated communities in New Jersey
National Register of Historic Places in Burlington County, New Jersey
Historic districts on the National Register of Historic Places in New Jersey
New Jersey Register of Historic Places